Bowman Inlet is an ice-filled inlet between Kay Nunatak and Platt Point on the Hollick-Kenyon Peninsula, on the east coast of the Antarctic Peninsula. The inlet was photographed from the air by Lincoln Ellsworth, November 23, 1935, and its western shore was mapped from the photographs by W.L.G. Joerg. It was rephotographed by the United States Antarctic Service, 1940, the Ronne Antarctic Research Expedition, 1947, and was surveyed by the Falkland Islands Dependencies Survey, 1958. It was named by the Advisory Committee on Antarctic Names after Lieutenant Bradley J. Bowman, U.S. Navy Reserve, officer in charge, Palmer Station Construction Unit, Operation Deep Freeze, 1969.

Platt Point is the east entrance point to the inlet on the east coast of Antarctic Peninsula. The feature marks the extremity of an ice-covered, though clearly outlined, spur that juts north from the west part of Hollick-Kenyon Peninsula. The margins of the feature were photographed from the air by Lincoln Ellsworth, 1935, but it was more clearly defined by aerial photographs taken by the United States Antarctic Service (USAS), 1940. Named by Advisory Committee on Antarctic Names (US-ACAN) in 1977 for William D. Platt, U.S. Navy, hospital corpsman, Palmer Station, winter party 1968.

References
 

Inlets of Graham Land
Bowman Coast